Ascobolus carbonarius is a species of apothecial fungus belonging to the family Ascobolaceae.

This is a European species appearing in spring and summer as olive-brown coloured discs up to 5 mm across on burned ground.

References

Ascobolus carbonarius at Species Fungorum

Pezizales
Fungi described in 1871